The 2005–06 European Challenge Cup pool stage was the opening stage of the tenth season of the European Challenge Cup, the second-tier competition for European rugby union clubs. It began with all twenty teams playing on 22 October 2005 and ended when Bristol hosted Narbonne on 22 January 2006.

Twenty teams participated in this phase of the competition; they were divided into five pools of four teams each, with each team playing the others home and away. Competition points were earned using the standard bonus point system. The five pool winners and the best three runners-up advanced to the knockout stage. These teams then competed in a single-elimination tournament that ended with the final at the Twickenham Stoop in London on 21 May 2006.

Results
All times are local to the game location.

{| class="wikitable"
|+ Key to colours
|-
| style="background: #ccffcc;" |     
| Winner of each pool, advance to quarterfinals. Seed # in parentheses
|-
| style="background: #ccccff;" |     
| Three highest-scoring second-place teams advance to quarterfinals. Seed # in parentheses
|}

Pool 1

Pool 2

Pool 3

Pool 4

Pool 5

Seeding and runners-up

See also
European Challenge Cup
2005–06 Heineken Cup

References

pool stage
2005-06